Bryan Walter Guinness, 2nd Baron Moyne,  (27 October 1905 – 6 July 1992) was a British lawyer, poet, novelist and socialite. He was an heir to part of the Anglo-Irish Guinness family brewing fortune, and briefly married to Diana Mitford, one of the Mitford sisters.

Early life
He was born to Walter Guinness (created 1st Baron Moyne in 1932), son of Edward Guinness, 1st Earl of Iveagh, and Lady Evelyn Stuart Erskine, daughter of the 14th Earl of Buchan.  He attended Heatherdown School, near Ascot in Berkshire, followed by Eton College (also in Berkshire), and Christ Church, Oxford, and was called to the bar in 1931.

At Oxford, Guinness was part of the Railway Club, which included: Henry Yorke, Roy Harrod, Henry Thynne, 6th Marquess of Bath, David Plunket Greene, Edward Henry Charles James Fox-Strangways, 7th Earl of Ilchester, Brian Howard, Michael Parsons, 6th Earl of Rosse, John Sutro, Hugh Lygon, Harold Acton, Patrick Balfour, 3rd Baron Kinross, Mark Ogilvie-Grant, John Drury-Lowe.

As an heir to the Guinness brewing fortune and a handsome, charming young man, Bryan was an eligible bachelor. One of London's "bright young things", he was an organiser of the 1929 "Bruno Hat" hoax art exhibition, held at his home in London.

Marriages and family
In 1929, Guinness married Hon. Diana Mitford, one of the Mitford sisters.  They had two sons:

 Jonathan Bryan Guinness, 3rd Baron Moyne (born 16 March 1930)
 Hon. Desmond Walter Guinness (8 September 1931 – 20 August 2020)

The couple became leaders of the London artistic and social scene and were dedicatees of Evelyn Waugh's second novel Vile Bodies.  However, they divorced in 1933, after Diana deserted Guinness for British fascist leader Sir Oswald Mosley.

Guinness remarried in 1936 to Elisabeth Nelson (1912–1999), daughter of Thomas Arthur Nelson of the Nelson publishing family, with whom he had nine children:

 Hon. Rosaleen Elisabeth Guinness (born 7 September 1937), married Sudhir Mulji
 Hon. Diarmid Edward Guinness (23 September 1938 – 15 August 1977), married Felicity, daughter of Sir Andrew Carnwath
 Hon. Fiona Evelyn Guinness (born 26 June 1940)
 Hon. Dr Finn Benjamin Guinness (born 26 August 1945), married Mary Price
 Hon. Thomasin Margaret Guinness (born 16 January 1947)
 Hon. Kieran Arthur Guinness (born 11 February 1949), married Vivienne Halban
 Hon. Catriona Rose Guinness (born 13 December 1950)
 Hon. Erskine Stuart Richard Guinness (born 16 January 1953), married Louise Dillon-Malone
 Hon. Mirabel Jane Guinness (born 8 September 1956), married Patrick Helme

Public life
During World War II, Guinness served for three years in the Middle East with the Spears Mission to the Free French, being a fluent French speaker, with the rank of Major. Then, in November 1944, Guinness succeeded to the barony when his father, posted abroad as Resident Minister in the Middle East by his friend Winston Churchill, was assassinated in Cairo.

After the war, Lord Moyne served on the board of the Guinness corporation as vice-chairman from 1947 to 1979, as well as the Guinness Trust and the Iveagh Trust, sitting as a crossbencher in the House of Lords. He served for 35 years as a trustee of the National Gallery of Ireland and donated several works to the gallery. He wrote a number of critically applauded novels, memoirs, books of poetry, and plays. With Frank Pakenham he sought the return of the "Lane Bequest" to Dublin, resulting in the 1959 compromise agreement. He was invested as a Fellow of the Royal Society of Literature. He served as pro-chancellor of Trinity College Dublin from 1965-1977, and was made an honorary fellow in 1977.

Lord Moyne died in 1992 at Biddesden, his Wiltshire home (near Andover, Hampshire), and was succeeded by his eldest son Jonathan.

Bibliography
Plays: The Fragrant Concubine, A Tragedy (1938); A Riverside Charade (1954)
Children's books: The Story of Johnny and Jemima (1936); The Children of the Desert (1947); The Animal's Breakfast (1950); Catriona and the Grasshopper (1957); Priscilla and the Prawn (1960); The Girl with the Flower (1966).
Poetry: Twenty-three Poems (1931); Under the Eyelid (1935); Reflexions (1947); Collected Poems (1956); The Rose in the Tree (1964); The Clock (1973); On a Ledge (1992).
Novels: Singing Out of Tune (1933); Landscape with Figures (1934); A Week by the Sea (1936); Lady Crushwell's Companion (1938); A Fugue of Cinderellas (1956); Leo and Rosabelle (1961); The Giant's Eye (1964); The Engagement (1969); Hellenic Flirtation (1978)
Memoirs: Potpourri (1982); Personal Patchwork 1939–45 (1986); Diary Not Kept (1988).
Songs: Ed. WB Yeats: Broadsides; a Collection of Old and New Songs (1935); Cuala Press, Dublin.

Further reading
The Story of a Nutcracker (with Desmond McCarthy, 1953).
Gannon Charles: Cathal Gannon – The Life and Times of a Dublin Craftsman (Dublin 2006).

Notes

External links

1905 births
1992 deaths
Barons Moyne
People educated at Eton College
People educated at Heatherdown School
Alumni of Christ Church, Oxford
Bryan Guinness, 2nd Baron Moyne
Honorary Fellows of Trinity College Dublin
Irish art collectors
English barristers
British Army personnel of World War II
20th-century English novelists
20th-century English poets
20th-century British lawyers
British male poets
English male novelists
20th-century English male writers
20th-century English lawyers